Dysphania percota, the blue tiger moth, is a moth of the family Geometridae that can be found in India. It was first described by Charles Swinhoe in 1891.

Description
It is similar to Dysphania palmyra, but differs in the whole apical area of the forewings being deep purple from the discocellular spot and postmedial line to outer margin, with two small blue spots below the sub-costals and one on inner margin near outer angle. Hindwings never with any trace of yellow.

The larvae feed on Carallia species.

Gallery

See also
Dysphania militaris
Dysphania sagana
Dysphania palmyra

References

Geometrinae
Moths described in 1891